Brzustów  is a village in the administrative district of Gmina Garbatka-Letnisko, within Kozienice County, Masovian Voivodeship, in east-central Poland. 

History
At the beginning of World War I (Autumn 1914) Kozienice forest became a long-term military audience.
During the so-called, Dęblin operation, in the region of Laski-Anielin fought the Polish Legions troops, led by the Józef Piłsudski.

On October 22 the II battalion of Polish Legions  led by Major Edward Rydz-Śmigły fought in the woods near the village of Anielin fierce and bloody battle with 3  Russian battalions.

And on October 22–26, 1914, the branch of I Brigade of the Polish Legions, fought heavy battle with Russian troops in the village of Laski.

In 1933 a monument-mausoleum erected in honor of fallen legionnaires, moving in a place with the remains scattered around the graves, the mass grave in Brzustów.
The monument is located near the railway station Żytkowice.

See also 
 Brzustów
 Brzustówek

References

External links
 
 
 

Villages in Kozienice County